Maharishi is a Sanskrit word.

Maharishi may also refer to:

Maharshi (1988 film), a Telugu film
Maharshi (2019 film), an Indian Telugu action drama film
Maharishi (writer),  a Tamil writer